PGC may refer to:
Pennsylvania Game Commission
Persian Gulf Cup, Iran's highest association football league
PGC (gene)
PGC 1000714, a ring galaxy
PGC-1α, a protein which is the master regulator of mitochondrial biogenesis
Playwrights Guild of Canada
Postgraduate Certificate, usually written as PgC
Presbyterian Girls' College in Warwick, Australia, now part of Scots PGC College
Primordial germ cell
Prince George's County, Maryland
Principal Galaxies Catalogue
Principle of Generic Consistency, see Alan Gewirth
Professional Graphics Controller
Program chain, which defines the order in which cells, tiles (video, menus, etc.) are played back on a DVD
Psychiatric Genomics Consortium, founded 2007 as the Psychiatric Genome Wide Association Consortium
Punjab Group of Colleges, Pakistan
The University of Pennsylvania Glee Club